The Men's mass start event of the Biathlon World Championships 2016 was held on 13 March 2016. 30 athletes will participate over a course of 15 km.

Results
The race was started at 16:00 CET.

References

Men's mass start